Tweeddale, Ettrick and Lauderdale was a county constituency represented in the House of Commons of the Parliament of the United Kingdom from 1983. In 2005 the constituency was abolished and the area is now represented by Berwickshire, Roxburgh and Selkirk, Midlothian, and Dumfriesshire, Clydesdale and Tweeddale.

The Scottish Parliament constituency of Tweeddale, Ettrick and Lauderdale, which covered the same area, was in existence until the 2011 Scottish Parliament election.

Boundaries
Formed for the 1983 election, the seat of Tweeddale, Ettrick and Lauderdale comprised the majority of the former Roxburgh, Selkirk and Peebles, with other areas coming in from Berwick and East Lothian and Midlothian. It was formed from the Tweeddale District, and the Ettrick and Lauderdale District. There were slight boundary changes in 1997, due to a local government boundary change in 1989.

Members of Parliament

Election results

Elections in the 1980s

Elections in the 1990s

Elections in the 2000s

References

Historic parliamentary constituencies in Scotland (Westminster)
Constituencies of the Parliament of the United Kingdom established in 1983
Constituencies of the Parliament of the United Kingdom disestablished in 2005
Politics of the Scottish Borders